The 2014 1. divisjon was a Norwegian second-tier football league season. The league was contested by 16 teams, and the top two teams won promotion to Tippeligaen, while the teams placed from third to sixth place played a promotion-playoff against the 14th-placed team in Tippeligaen to win promotion. The bottom four teams were relegated to the 2. divisjon.

The first round of the season was played on 6 April 2014 and ended with the last round on 2 November 2014.

Team changes from 2013
In the 2013 1. divisjon, Bodø/Glimt and Stabæk won promotion to Tippeligaen, while Tromsø and Hønefoss were relegated to the 1. divisjon.

Elverum, Follo, Kongsvinger and Vard Haugesund were relegated from the 2013 1. division, while Bærum, Alta, Nest-Sotra and Tromsdalen were promoted from the 2013 2. division.

Teams

Managerial changes

League table

Top scorers

Source:

References

Norwegian First Division seasons
2
Norway
Norway